Grubb's Tramway is the name of at least two non-related tramways in Tasmania:
Grubb's Tramway (Mowbray)
Grubb's Tramway (Zeehan) also known as Grubb's Tram